Gardner Cox (5 February 1920 – 30 March 1988) was an American sailor. He competed in the 5.5 Metre event at the 1968 Summer Olympics.

References

1920 births
1988 deaths
American male sailors (sport)
Olympic sailors of the United States
Sailors at the 1968 Summer Olympics – 5.5 Metre